Wer wird Millionär? was a Swiss game show based on the original British format of Who Wants to Be a Millionaire?. It was hosted by René Rindlisbacher. The show was broadcast from 27 March 2000 to 2001. It was shown on the Swiss TV station TV3.

The main goal of the show was to win 1 million CHF by answering 15 multiple-choice questions correctly. There were three 'lifelines': fifty-fifty, phoning a friend, and asking the audience. The biggest prize won on the show was 500,000 CHF, won by Hans Frauchiger.

From 29 November to 13 December 2011, Swiss TV station 3+ resumed the show with slight changes: the lifeline 'ask the audience' was replaced by 'ask the experts' and the candidate needs to choose at the beginning of the game whether he plays the save or the risky variant. If he chooses the risky variant, he gets a fourth lifeline, 'switch the question', but loses the second guaranteed sum.

Money tree

References
Article about the show (weltwoche.ch)

Who Wants to Be a Millionaire?
Swiss television series
2000 Swiss television series debuts
2001 Swiss television series endings
2011 Swiss television series debuts
2000s Swiss television series
2010s Swiss television series
German-language television shows
TV3 (Swiss TV channel) original programming